The Wenzel House is a single family home located at 1203 South Fayette in Saginaw, Michigan. It was listed on the National Register of Historic Places in 1982.

History
This house was constructed in 1874 for Mr. Wenzel, a Saginaw harness maker. It was later sold to Harold Sperbeck, who owned it into the 1980s..

Description
The Wenzel House is a two-story frame Italianate house with bracketed eaves and a pediment breaking the eavesline of each facade. The house has a low-pitched hip roof, with a twelve pane belvedere having an arched roof line in the center of the main roof. A one-story wing is connected to the rear, and has an alcove porch rimmed by dentils. A classically-inspired front porch is a later addition; it has a hipped roof, balustrade, and columns.

References

		
National Register of Historic Places in Saginaw County, Michigan
Italianate architecture in Michigan
Neoclassical architecture in Michigan
Houses completed in 1874